The pygmy splayfoot salamander (Chiropterotriton lavae), also known as the pygmy flat-footed salamander, is a species of salamander in the family Plethodontidae. It is endemic to the central-western Veracruz state, Mexico. Its natural habitats are pine-oak and cloud forests at about  altitude. It lives in bromeliads. It is threatened by severe habitat loss caused by logging and mining.

References

Chiropterotriton
Endemic amphibians of Mexico
Fauna of the Trans-Mexican Volcanic Belt
Taxonomy articles created by Polbot
Amphibians described in 1942